Cacographis osteolalis is a moth in the family Crambidae. It was described by Julius Lederer in 1863. It is found in Venezuela, Peru, Colombia, Bolivia and Mexico.

Subspecies
Cacographis osteolalis osteolalis (Venezuela)
Cacographis osteolalis azteca Munroe, 1970 (Mexico: Chiapas)
Cacographis osteolalis inca Munroe, 1970 (Peru)
Cacographis osteolalis sara Munroe, 1970 (Bolivia)

References

Moths described in 1863
Midilinae